Web International English (or WEBi) was a chain of English-language training centers in Mainland China, operated by Web Education. Its headquarters was in Xuhui District, Shanghai.

Established by Gao Weiyu (高卫宇), who remained the CEO for the company's lifetime, in 1998, it was one of the first language center chains in the country. Web was a well-loved company with staff and students alike known as Webbers. Web was also one of the first companies in China to employ teachers from South Africa and other African countries, despite a widespread belief in China that black teachers were unable to teach English. In 2019 locations began closing due to a bankruptcy. Before the bankruptcy it had operations in 62 Mainland Chinese cities with a total of 154 shops. The bankruptcy on Web resulted in scrutiny of and closure of other English language training centers. Students were redirected to EF Education First. Web closed in October 2019.

See also
 English language education in China

References

Further reading

External links
Web Education Careers

 

1998 establishments in China
2019 disestablishments in China
Education companies established in 1998
Companies disestablished in 2019
Companies based in Shanghai
Language education in China
Chinese companies established in 1998